INS Angre is a "stone frigate" (shore establishment) of the Indian Navy in Mumbai. It is the shore-based logistics and administrative support establishment of the Western Naval Command. It is also the base depot ship of the Command and is the seat of the Flag Officer Commanding-in-Chief Western Naval Command. The establishment is named after the Maratha Navy Admiral Kanhoji Angre.

History
In 1548, Garcia de Orta leased the marshy islands, which later became Bombay, from John III of Portugal. Orta build a wooden structure called the Manor House. Later, a seawall was constructed around Manor House,with four guns mounted on it and the area came to be known as Castle Barracks. In the Marriage Treaty of Charles II of England and Catherine of Braganza, daughter of King John IV of Portugal, the islands were given in dowry to the English empire. In 1668, the East India Company (EIC) leased Bombay from the empire and in 1686, the headquarters in India of the EIC was moved from Surat to Castle Barracks.

In 1940, the castle was commissioned as HMIS Dalhousie as a naval base of the Royal Indian Navy. On 26 January 1950, when India became a republic, the base was renamed INS Dalhousie. On 15 September 1951, INS Dalhousie was renamed INS Angre in the honour of the famous admiral (sarkhel) of the Maratha Navy Kanhoji Angre.

Today
INS Angre today is the base depot ship of the Western Naval Command. It is the logistics and administrative support establishment of the Command, supporting all ships and units based in Mumbai. The Manor House which has since been re-built, is the seat of the Flag Officer Commanding-in-Chief Western Naval Command. The commanding officer (CO) of the establishment is also the station commander of South Mumbai and is a one-star officer with the rank of Commodore. Since the establishment is also known as Naval barracks, the CO is also known as COMBRAX (Commodore Naval Barracks).

Crest
The crest of INS Angre has peaks of the Sahyadri mountain range (also known as Western ghats) on which is planted a trident. The trident was a symbol of power worshipped by the Marathas under Chhatrapati Shivaji.

See also
List of Indian Navy bases
List of active Indian Navy ships
Stone frigate

References

Bibliography

1548 establishments in India
Buildings and structures completed in 1548
Indian Navy bases
Buildings and structures in Mumbai